The dinero was the currency of the Christian states of Spain from the 10th century. It was copied from the Arab Dinar and served in turn as the model for the Portuguese dinheiro.

In most of Spain, the dinero was superseded by the maravedí and then the real as the unit of account. However, in Catalonia and the Balearic Islands, the currency system based on the dinero continued, with twelve dineros to the sou and six sous the peseta.

Note that in modern Spanish, "dinero" means "money".

Modern obsolete currencies
Coins of Spain